Lixophaga is a genus of flies in the family Tachinidae.

Species
Lixophaga aberrans (Townsend, 1929)
Lixophaga alberta (Curran, 1925)
Lixophaga albidula (Wulp, 1890)
Lixophaga angusta (Townsend, 1927)
Lixophaga aristalis (Townsend, 1927)
Lixophaga aurata (Blanchard, 1937)
Lixophaga aurea (Thompson, 1968)
Lixophaga beardsleyi Hardy, 1981
Lixophaga brasiliana (Townsend, 1927)
Lixophaga caledonia (Curran, 1929)
Lixophaga charapensis (Townsend, 1927)
Lixophaga cincta (Walker, 1853)
Lixophaga cinctella (Mesnil, 1957)
Lixophaga cinerea Yang, 1988
Lixophaga claripalpis (Thompson, 1968)
Lixophaga clausa (Townsend, 1927)
Lixophaga croesus (Townsend, 1928)
Lixophaga diatraeae (Townsend, 1916)
Lixophaga discalis (Coquillett, 1902)
Lixophaga dubiosa (Thompson, 1968)
Lixophaga dyscerae Shi, 1991
Lixophaga facialis (Townsend, 1931)
Lixophaga fallax Mesnil, 1963
Lixophaga famelica (Wiedemann, 1830)
Lixophaga fasciata Curran, 1930
Lixophaga fitzgeraldi (Curran, 1937)
Lixophaga flavescens (Wulp, 1890)
Lixophaga fulvescens (Townsend, 1927)
Lixophaga fumipennis (Townsend, 1927)
Lixophaga galbae (Thompson, 1968)
Lixophaga grisea (Curran, 1926)
Lixophaga impatiens (Curran, 1925)
Lixophaga jennei Aldrich, 1926
Lixophaga latigena Shima, 1979
Lixophaga leucophaea (Wulp, 1890)
Lixophaga limoniina (Richter, 1995)
Lixophaga mediocris Aldrich, 1925
Lixophaga neglecta (Wulp, 1890)
Lixophaga nigrocincta (Wulp, 1890)
Lixophaga nubilosa (Wulp, 1890)
Lixophaga obscura (Thompson, 1968)
Lixophaga opaca (Wulp, 1890)
Lixophaga opsiangusta Nihei & Dios, 2016 (new name for Lixophaga angusta (Townsend, 1927) (Cataphorinia))
Lixophaga orbitalis Aldrich, 1926
Lixophaga pacata (Wulp, 1890)
Lixophaga parva Townsend, 1908
Lixophaga plumbea Aldrich, 1925
Lixophaga plumosula (Townsend, 1927)
Lixophaga pollinosa (Thompson, 1968)
Lixophaga proletaria (Townsend, 1927)
Lixophaga punctata (Townsend, 1927)
Lixophaga puscolulo Carrejo & Woodley, 2013
Lixophaga remissa (Wulp, 1890)
Lixophaga remora Reinhard, 1953
Lixophaga retiniae (Coquillett, 1897)
Lixophaga santacruzi (Thompson, 1968)
Lixophaga scintilla Reinhard, 1953
Lixophaga similis (Wulp, 1890)
Lixophaga similis (Thompson, 1968)
Lixophaga simplex (Walker, 1858)
Lixophaga solitaria (Curran, 1926)
Lixophaga sphenophori (Villeneuve, 1911)
Lixophaga stenomae Curran, 1935
Lixophaga subtilis (Wulp, 1890)
Lixophaga tenuis (Blanchard, 1959)
Lixophaga thompsoniana Nihei & Dios, 2016 (new name for Lixophaga fumipennis (Thompson, 1968))
Lixophaga thoracica (Curran, 1930)
Lixophaga townsendi Guimarães, 1971
Lixophaga townsendiana Nihei & Dios, 2016 (new name for Lixophaga fumipennis (Townsend, 1928))
Lixophaga trichosoma (Wulp, 1890)
Lixophaga triconis (Reinhard, 1955)
Lixophaga umbrina (Wulp, 1890)
Lixophaga umbripennis (Wulp, 1890)
Lixophaga unicolor (Smith, 1917)
Lixophaga usta (Giglio-Tos, 1893)
Lixophaga variabilis (Coquillett, 1895)
Lixophaga villeneuvei (Baranov, 1934)

References

Exoristinae
Tachinidae genera
Diptera of Australasia
Diptera of South America
Diptera of North America
Taxa named by Charles Henry Tyler Townsend